Smear Campaign is the twelfth studio album by grindcore band Napalm Death. It was recorded with producer Russ Russell at Foel Studios, Wales, and was released on 15 September 2006. It was released as a regular CD, and as a digipak edition featuring two bonus tracks and a sticker of the cover artwork. Differently coloured versions of the cover art exist.

Shortly before the release, Barney Greenway mentioned that the album features a guest appearance by Anneke van Giersbergen, ex-vocalist for the Dutch rock band The Gathering, saying, "[She] has offered up a few parts to a track, which I've yet to hear. But before some people recoil in horror about Napalm going operatic rock or whatever, this was done for good effect and relevance to the track. It will work. It will rock. I'm sure. And we're grateful to Anneke (who is an awesome vocalist in her own right) in advance for giving it a stab."

Smear Campaign is a concept album criticising religion in general.

Track listing

Personnel

Napalm Death
 Mark "Barney" Greenway – lead vocals
 Mitch Harris – guitars, co-lead vocals
 Shane Embury – bass, backing vocals
 Danny Herrera – drums

Additional personnel
 Anneke van Giersbergen – additional vocals (1, 7)
 Russ Russell – production, engineering, recording, mixing
 Chris Fielding – assistant engineering
 Mick Kenney – album art
 Kevin Estrada – band photo

Chart positions

References

Napalm Death albums
Century Media Records albums
2006 albums
Concept albums